Greg Rusedski was the defending champion but lost in the second round to Scott Draper.

Andy Roddick won in the final 7–6(7–2), 6–4 against Paradorn Srichaphan.

Seeds
All sixteen seeds received a bye to the second round.

  Andy Roddick (champion)
  Paradorn Srichaphan (final)
  Sjeng Schalken (semifinals)
  Yevgeny Kafelnikov (third round)
  Jan-Michael Gambill (third round)
  Mardy Fish (third round)
  Robby Ginepri (quarterfinals)
  Hyung-Taik Lee (second round)
  Xavier Malisse (quarterfinals)
  Greg Rusedski (second round)
  Mario Ančić (second round)
  Brian Vahaly (second round)
  Lars Burgsmüller (third round)
  Nicolas Kiefer (quarterfinals)
  Kenneth Carlsen (second round)
  Justin Gimelstob (second round)

Draw

Finals

Top half

Section 1

Section 2

Bottom half

Section 3

Section 4

References
 2003 RCA Championships draw

Singles